Phyllis Derrick is a former international lawn bowls competitor for England.

Bowls career
In 1973 she won two silver medals, one in the pairs with Mavis Steele and one in the fours with Nancie Colling, Eileen Smith, and Joan Sparkes, at the 1973 World Outdoor Bowls Championship in Wellington, New Zealand. She also earned a bronze medal in the team event (Taylor Trophy).

In addition to the World Championship medals she won two singles titles in 1970 (two wood) and 1980 (four wood) and the 1966 pairs title at the England Women's National Championships when bowling for Magdalen Park Bowls Club, Surrey. She also won the singles at the British Isles Bowls Championships in 1981.

References

English female bowls players
Possibly living people
Year of birth missing